Ishq E Laa is a Pakistani television drama series produced by Momina Duraid under her banner productions, written by Qaisra Hayat and directed by Amin Iqbal. The serial marks the acting debut of Azaan Sami Khan, with Sajal Aly and Yumna Zaidi in main roles. It was broadcast weekly on Hum TV from 21 October 2021 to 2 June 2022.

Ishq-e-Laa revolves around the spiritual journey of a young man where he ultimately finds divine.

Plot 

Shanaya is a dedicated and courageous television journalist who loves what she does for a living. As a staunch human rights activist, she often undertakes potentially dangerous assignments to uncover social issues. She is in love with her childhood friend, Azlan, a self-assertive and hardworking businessman. Although the two of them are inseparable and have been best friends for years, he does not reciprocate her feelings.

When a disheartened Shanaya begins to consider a marriage proposal from another man, Azlan realizes that he cannot afford to lose his best friend. He proposes to her and they get married, much to the delight of their respective families. Although the newlyweds have a strong relationship, his inability to understand her passion for social work begins to fracture their marriage.

Azka is an ambitious student who aspires to be a doctor. She constantly receives unwanted attention from Abid, a young man with questionable morals and ethics. Due to misunderstandings created by Azka's spiteful sister-in-law, Azka is almost married off to Abid. However, her sister-in-law eventually comes to her senses and calls off the wedding.

A businessman's son kills Sultan (Azka's brother). Shanaya helps Sultan's family to fight against the Businessman Arbab Haroon. In later turns and events Arbab Haroon kills Shanaya to protect his son, taking away all the evidences against his son.
This tragedy shatters Azlan and he remains numb and lost for long time. 
His parents helps him realise the fact and move on. 
Later on Azlan goes on to bring justice to his wife. 
Meanwhile Azlan also fulfills the promise made by his wife (Shanaya) to fund Azka's Medical College expenses.

5 years later, Azka becomes a doctor. Her friend from College, Zain likes her but she doesn’t feel the same way about him.

Azlan’s mother is sick, and Azka has to give her kidney to her. To do so, she enters a contract marriage with Azlan.

Azlan thinks Azka just donated her kidney to her mother for money, but she’s a good daughter in law and actually only cares about her mother in law and not the money.

Azlan then realizes how good she is, and apologizes to her for being rude and for his every impoliteness and arrogance. He also tells Azka how much he loves her, which he couldn’t to Shanaya before she died.

The drama then ends, with Azlan going to Shanaya’s grave with Azka and Proffesor. Rehman talking about Ishq e Laa (eternal love).

Cast

Main  
 Azaan Sami Khan as Azlan Ahmed, Shanaya and Azka husband
 Sajal Aly as Shanaya Azlan Ahmed (Dead), Azlan's best friend turned love interest and first wife
 Yumna Zaidi as Dr. Azka Rahman, Azlan's second wife

Supporting 
 Ghazala Kaifee as Sitwat; Azlan's mother
 Zain Ullah as Makeel; Azlan’s old friend 
 Uzma Hassan as Kanwal Sultan; Sultan's wife
 Seemi Raheel as Khadija; Azka's mother
 Ahmad Taha Ghani as Zain Ahmed; Azka's class fellow
 Usman Peerzada as Ghiyas Ahmad; Azlan's father
 Sohail Sameer as Sultan; Azka's brother
 Adnan Samad Khan as Abid Ali; Kanwal's cousin
 Nargis Rasheed as Nusrat; Abid's mother and Kanwal's aunt
 Laila Wasti as Shireen; Shanaya's mother
 Nadeem Baig as Prof. Rehman
 Moazzam Ali Khan as Arbab Haroon; a manipulative politician
 Samia Butt as Zunaira; Zain's sister
 Khalid Butt as Zain's father
 Shaista Jabeen as Zain's mother
 Laila Zuberi as Mehnaz; Shireen's friend and Fahad's mother
 Arslan Asad Butt as Fahad; Mehnaz's son

Soundtrack

The official soundtrack of the series "Saathiya" was performed by Azaan Sami Khan who also composed the music while lyrics were written by Asim Raza. In January 2022, another soundtrack of the series "Ibadat" was released, which was also performed and composed by Khan who also co-wrote the lyrics with AM Turaz.

Reception

Critical reception 

The series mostly received positive reviews for its performances and script. On premiere, it received mixed reviews for storyline and execution. Critics praised the characters of Aly, Zaidi, Raheel and Hassan, in general the female portrayal.

Television ratings

References

External links 
 

Pakistani drama television series
Television series by MD Productions
2021 Pakistani television series debuts